Jasmine Jobson (born 9 May 1995) is an English actress best known for starring as Jaq in the 2019 Netflix British television crime drama series Top Boy, for which she was nominated for a BAFTA, and for playing Lily in feature film Surge, which premiered at the 2020 Sundance Film Festival.

Early life
Jasmine Jobson was born 9 May 1995 in Hayes, West London, England. Her mum is of Irish and Greek-Cypriot heritage, her dad is Jamaican. From a very young age (around 6), Jobson showed talent singing by mimicking television stars, so her mother enrolled her to ‘Paddington Arts’, a Youth Arts organisation dedicated to developing talent andcreativity in London’s young people, where Jobson honed her talents. 

As a child Jobson had asked to be separated from her mother by social services and placed into foster care, living in West Drayton for five years. The results prevailed In adulthood though, Jobson taught herself how to channel that aggression and emotions into her acting. When asked by the casting director for Top Boy to show some anger in her audition, Jobson threw a chair across the room, nearly hitting a window, securing her the role in the production.

Jobson joined the Big House Theatre which provides drama-based workshops and training on team building, challenges management and confidence development and focuses on helping young people who have been through the UK’s care system. Maggie Norris, chief executive of Big House, described Jobson as an extraordinary talent.

Career
Jobson began her acting career in theatre, performing in plays such as Phoenix: A Girl on Fire and Wild Diamonds at the Hackney Down Studios in 2013. From 2014, Jobson performed in several short films Flea, A Generation of Vipers, and The King, before debuting on television in 2016 as Kia Hopkins in a single episode of Suspects (TV series). Since then she has made minor appearances in The Break (TV series)  , Five by Five  and Dark Heart (TV series)   as Sally Watkins, before landing a main character role in the 2019 Netflix British television crime drama series Top Boy.  In 2019, Jobson was nominated for and won the Best emerging talent at the Movie and Video Awards (MVISA).

In 2020, Jobson starred as Lily in feature film Surge, which premiered in January 2020 at the Sundance Film Festival in Salt Lake City.  Jobson purported to be comfortable in an airport environment, the setting for Surge, as she once worked as a bartender in Wetherspoons at Heathrow's Terminal 2.

In 2020, Jobson was nominated for British Academy Television Award for Best Supporting Actress

In 2023, Jobson takes the protagonist role in the ITV1 psychological thriller Platform 7, alongside actors Phil Davis and Toby Regbo.

Filmography

Film

Television

Awards and nominations

References

External links

CAM Agent - Jasmine Jobson
Jasmine Jobson - twitter
Jasmine Jobson - Instagram
 

1995 births
Living people
21st-century English actresses
Actresses from London
Black British actresses
English television actresses
English film actresses
People from Hayes, Hillingdon